Centriscus is a genus of shrimpfishes found in the Indian and Pacific Oceans.

Species
Currently, two recognized species are placed in this genus:
 Centriscus cristatus (De Vis, 1885) (smooth razorfish)
 Centriscus scutatus Linnaeus, 1758 (grooved razorfish)

References

Centriscidae
Marine fish genera
Taxa named by Carl Linnaeus